Ray is the second album by the English pop group Frazier Chorus, released in 1991 by Virgin Records. A limited edition version of the LP and CD included The Baby Album, a four track bonus remix disc. The four bonus remixes were also appended to the end of the cassette edition. The songs were written by Tim Freeman.

Critical reception

The St. Petersburg Times opined: "What seems at first play to aspire to be little more than a collection of richly produced but understated songs turns out to be a peculiar, ambitious combination of sweet instrumentation and perversely harsh lyrics." The Boston Globe wrote that "there's mostly, hushed, seductive vocals coasting along lolling, mid-tempo rhythms and consistently ingratiating melodies: wave upon ever-shifting wave"; the paper named it one of the best albums of 1991. The State determined that "Frazier Chorus may specialize in synth pop lite, but there's a certain atmospheric artiness that seduces the listener with its simplicity."

Track listing

The Baby Album

Personnel 

Frazier Chorus
Chris Taplin – programming, guitar
Kate Holmes – woodwind, EWI, vocals
Tim Freeman – keyboards, vocals

Additional musicians
Roddy Lorimer – flugel horn
Mae McKenna – backing vocals
Mark Feltham – harmonica
Reggae Philharmonic Orchestra – strings
Louis Jardim – percussion
Greg Fitzgerald – backing vocals
Michael Timoney – piano
Chris Haigh – fiddle

Technical
Ian Broudie – producer (tracks 1–6, 8–10)
Cenzo Townsend – engineer
Clif Brigden – co-producer (track 7)
Frazier Chorus – co-producer (track 7)
Gordon Vicary – mastering
Michael Nash Associates – design
Platon Antoniou – portraits
Paul Oakenfold – remixing (The Baby Album: tracks 1–2)
Steve Osborne – engineer (The Baby Album: tracks 1–2)
Youth – remixing (The Baby Album: tracks 3–4)

Chart performance

References

External links

Music videos from Ray
 1. "Cloud 8"
 2. "Heaven"
 7. "Nothing"

Frazier Chorus albums
1991 albums